The Calcutta Historical Society was a learned society of Indian history founded in 1907. It published a journal Bengal, Past & Present, of which Walter K. Firminger was the first editor.

References 

Scientific societies based in India
History of Kolkata
Historical societies
1907 establishments in India
History organisations based in India